The Willamette Meteorite, officially named Willamette and originally known as Tomanowos by the Clackamas Chinook Native American tribe, is an iron-nickel meteorite found in the U.S. state of Oregon. It is the largest meteorite found in the United States and the sixth largest in the world. There was no impact crater at the discovery site; researchers believe the meteorite landed in what is now Canada or Montana, and was transported as a glacial erratic to the Willamette Valley during the Missoula Floods at the end of the last Ice Age (~13,000 years ago). It has long been held sacred by indigenous peoples of the Willamette Valley, including the federally recognized Confederated Tribes of the Grand Ronde Community of Oregon (CTGRC). 

The meteorite is on display at the American Museum of Natural History in New York City, which acquired it in 1906. Having been seen by an estimated 40 million people over the years, and given its striking appearance, it is among the most famous meteorites. In 2005, the CTGRC sued to have the meteorite returned to their control, ultimately reaching an agreement that gave the tribe access to the meteorite while allowing the museum to keep it as long as they are exhibiting it.

Physical characteristics and formation

It is classified as a type III iron meteorite, being composed of over 91% iron and 7.62% nickel, with traces of cobalt and phosphorus. Most iron meteorites like Willamette have originated from the differentiated core of planetesimals or asteroids that collided with another object. Willamette has a recrystallized structure with only traces of a medium Widmanstätten pattern; it is the result of a significant impact-heating event on the parent body. The Willamette Meteorite contains higher concentrations of various metals that are quite rare in Earth's crust. For example, iridium, one of the least abundant elements in Earth's crust, is found in the Willamette Meteorite at a concentration of 4.7 ppm, thousands of times more concentrated than in the crust.

Emplacement and erosion

The lack of an impact crater at the discovery site was only explained after the 1920s, with the new understanding about the Missoula Floods, one of the largest floods documented, caused by the collapse of an ice barrier during the last deglaciation. The meteorite presumably landed on an ice cap in what is now Montana or western Canada, and was dragged by the glacier ice to the vicinity of an ice barrier that formed across the Clark Fork River. This barrier had ponded a huge amount of water at the Lake Missoula right at the time when the meteorite reached the area and the ice barrier became unstable and breached. The resulting flood involved up to 10 million cubic meters per second of water discharge, with large blocks of ice rafting down the Columbia River and the Willamette Valley at the end of the last Ice Age (~13,000 years ago). Some of these ice rafts included boulders (known as glacial erratics by geologists) like the Willamette meteorite, which eventually sank in the flood waters and settled where they were found by humans.

The deep crevasses of the meteorite resulted from both its high-speed atmospheric entry and its subsequent weathering. Exposed to the elements for thousands of years, rainwater interacted with the mineral troilite, resulting in a form of sulfuric acid which slowly dissolved portions of the meteorite. This resulted in the gradual development of the hollows that are visible today.

Modern history
The Willamette Meteorite has been venerated by the Clackamas people since long before it was removed from its location in the Willamette Valley near the modern city of West Linn, Oregon. In 1902, Ellis Hughes was the first European settler to recognize the meteorite's significance. At that time the land was owned by the Oregon Iron and Steel Company. Hughes attempted to claim ownership of the meteorite, and secretly moved it to his own land. This involved 90 days of hard work to cover the 3/4 mile (1200 m) distance. The move was discovered, and after a lawsuit, the Oregon Supreme Court held that Oregon Iron and Steel Company was the legal owner.

In 1905, Sarah Tappan Hoadley, wife of William E. Dodge Jr., purchased the meteorite for $26,000 (around $680,000 in 2011). After displaying it at the Lewis and Clark Centennial Exposition, she donated it to the American Museum of Natural History in New York City, where it has been on display since 1906.

The Clackamas people have long used the meteorite, which they call Tomanowos, in ceremonies. In 1999 the Confederated Tribes of the Grand Ronde Community of Oregon (CTGRC), a confederation of Native American tribes, demanded that it be returned and filed an action pursuant to the Native American Graves Protection and Repatriation Act (NAGPRA) against the American Museum of Natural History. In response, the Museum filed a federal lawsuit seeking a declaratory judgment against the CTGRC in 2000. An agreement with the Museum was reached later that year in which the meteorite would remain at the museum with tribal members being able to conduct a private ceremony around the meteorite once a year, and that ownership will be transferred to CTGRC should the museum cease to have the meteorite on display.

In response to a student's request in 2007, Representative John Lim introduced a resolution that would demand that the museum return the meteorite to Oregon. The tribes said they were not consulted, they did not support the resolution, and were content with the current arrangement with the museum.

The  crown section of the meteorite that had been traded to the Macovich Collection for a Martian meteorite in 1997, was planned to be auctioned in October 2007, which led to claims by the CTGRC of insensitivity. Bidders dropped out when an editorial in the Portland Oregonian newspaper asserted the CTGRC would file a lawsuit against the new owner, but the CTGRC disavowed the editorial and said they had no such intent, and that they could not stop the sale. While the newspaper printed an apology, the specimen was withdrawn. A lawsuit was filed against the newspaper in Oregon Circuit Court and failed.

A ,  piece of the meteorite, also with a Macovich Collection provenance, was purchased in a 2006 auction and was displayed at the Evergreen Aviation & Space Museum in McMinnville, Oregon until it was returned to the Confederated Tribes of the Grande Ronde on February 22, 2019.

Mass

Circa 2008, pages of the American Museum of Natural History website stated both "15.5 tons" and "14 tons". There are differences between the metric ton, short ton, and long ton, each of which may simply be called a "ton". In 1906, the American Museum of Natural History stated that the weight of the meteorite was "at least 31,200 pounds, or about 15.6 tons", consistent with American usage of "ton" usually meaning the short ton. , the American Museum of Natural History website gives the weight as "15.5 tons."

Replicas
A replica of the meteorite is in Eugene, Oregon, outside the University of Oregon Museum of Natural and Cultural History on the University of Oregon campus. A 1/5 size replica stands in Fields Bridge Park in West Linn, Oregon. The only exact replica in existence is currently installed in the Chachalu Museum at the Confederated Tribes of Grand Ronde (CTGR) in Grand Ronde, Oregon. The aluminum replica was CNC-milled from a 3D model produced through photogrammetry by artist Garrick Imatani, working in conjunction with the CTGR. Imatani also created an interpretation of this meteorite that is on permanent display at the University of Oregon in Straub Hall.

See also
 Glossary of meteoritics
 List of largest meteorites on Earth

References

External links

On the agreement between American Museum of Natural History and the Confederated Tribes of the Grand Ronde Community
Map reference
Geological Society of Oregon on the Missoula Floods & the Willamette Meteorite
About the Williamette [sic] Meteorite in Oregon

Meteorites found in the United States
Willamette Valley
Sacred rocks
Native American religion
Geology of Oregon
West Linn, Oregon
Meteorites in culture
Glacial erratics of Oregon
Confederated Tribes of the Grand Ronde Community
American Museum of Natural History